Mooreland may refer to a place in the United States:

 Mooreland, Indiana
 Mooreland, Oklahoma
 Mooreland (Brentwood, Tennessee), a house on the National Register of Historic Places (NRHP)

See also 
 Moorland (disambiguation)
 Moreland (disambiguation)
 Morland (disambiguation)
 Westmorland